Basketball at the 1993 Games of the Small States of Europe was held in Malta between 26 and 29 May 1993.

Medal summary

Men's tournament
Men's tournament was played with a round-robin group composed by six teams.

Table

Women's tournament

External links
Results at the Cypriot Olympic Committee website
Malta basketball team at the GSSE
Times of Malta Archive

1993 in basketball
1993 Games of the Small States of Europe
Basketball at the Games of the Small States of Europe
Basketball in Malta